Bothria may refer to:

 bothria, plural of bothrium, an anatomical feature of the scolex of certain kinds of tapeworm.
 Bothria (fly), a genus of flies in the family Tachinidae